Live at the Marquee 1980 is a live album by British rock band Atomic Rooster, recorded at London's Marquee Club. No known live soundboard recordings exist of the 1980 (Crane/Du Cann/Hammond) lineup of Atomic Rooster and the source cassette tape, belonging to Du Cann, was recorded via a single onstage microphone.

Track listing 
 "They Took Control of You" (Du Cann, Clara Du Cann) 7:15
 "Death Walks Behind You" (Du Cann, Crane) 6:40
 "Watch Out!" (Crane) 4:48
 "Tomorrow Night" (Crane) 6:29
 "Seven Lonely Streets" (Du Cann) 8:37
 "Gershatzer" (Crane) 10:04
 "I Can't Take No More" (Du Cann) 8:51
 "In the Shadows" (Du Cann) 11:24
 "Devil’s Answer" (Du Cann) 5:58
 "Do You Know Who's Looking for You?" (Crane, Du Cann) 4:40

Personnel 
Atomic Rooster
 Vincent Crane - Hammond organ, bass pedals
 John Du Cann - guitars, vocals¨¨
 Paul Hammond - drums, percussion

Atomic Rooster live albums
2002 live albums
Live albums recorded at The Marquee Club